Stiftskirche St. Mauritius is a Catholic church on the Moritzberg in Hildesheim, Germany. The early Romanesque basilica built in 1058–1072 has been preserved without any major changes. The interior has been Baroque since the 18th century. The cloister is one of the city's most peaceful squares. Under the church is an impressive crypt, also used for church services.

External links 

 Official website
 360°-Panoramablick des Kreuzgangs
 Touristische Informationen
 pfarrgemeinde-st-mauritius.de

References 

11th-century Roman Catholic church buildings in Germany
Collegiate churches in Germany
Roman Catholic churches in Hildesheim
Churches in the Diocese of Hildesheim
Hildesheim